The 2002 St Albans City and District Council election took place on 2 May 2002 to elect members of St Albans District Council in Hertfordshire, England. One third of the council was up for election and the council stayed under no overall control.

After the election, the composition of the council was:
Conservative 21
Liberal Democrats 20
Labour 15
Independent 1
Vacant 1

Background
Before the election the Liberal Democrats were the largest party on the council with 23 councillors, compared to 19 for the Conservatives, 15 for Labour and there was 1 independent. 7 councillors stood down at the election, Liberal Democrats John Henchley, John Peters and Brian Roberts, Conservatives Richard Blossom, Patrick Johnston and Julian Turner, and Labour's David Enright.

The Liberal Democrats targeted Labour held seats in Ashley and St Peter's, while Labour aimed to pick up a seat in Cunningham. As well as the 3 main political parties, voters could also vote for the No Candidate Deserves My Vote! party in some wards, which was standing in order to give voters the chance to register their abstention at the polls.

Voting trial
A trial took place in Sopwell and Verulam wards under which voters could vote either by internet, phone, post or at the polling station using a touch screen system. The internet voting trial was funded by the Department for Transport, Local Government and the Regions as part of an attempt to get more people involved in elections. As a result of the trial one of the wards set the fastest declaration time at only 4 minutes after the close of polling. However turnout was actually down from 24.1% to 23.3% in Sopwell ward and down from 41.9% to 38.9% in Verulam ward compared to the last election in 2000.

Election result
The Conservatives gained 3 seats from the Liberal Democrats in Colney Heath, Harpenden North and Sandridge to become the largest party on the council with 21 councillors. The Liberal Democrats dropped to 20 seats, but did gain an increased share of the votes, while Labour stayed on 15 seats. There also remained 1 independent councillor and one seat was vacant after the death of Verulam Conservative councillor Michael Pugh on 22 April 2002. Overall turnout at the election was 38.22%, up from 33.56% at the 2000 election.

Ward results

By-elections between 2002 and 2003
A by-election was held in Verulam ward on 27 June 2002 after the death of Conservative councillor Michael Pugh. The seat was gained for the Liberal Democrats by Martin Frearson with a majority of 24 votes over the Conservatives, after Frearson had come second to the Conservatives in the seat at the council election in May.

Turnout increased by 2% from the May council election and the number of spoiled ballots dropped to 2 from 30 at the May election when the trial of electronic voting had taken place in the ward.

References

2002
2002 English local elections
2000s in Hertfordshire